André Truth, better known by his stage name Young Dre the Truth, is an American hip hop recording artist and actor born in Seattle, raised in Seattle, WA. He is known for his collaborations with Thugline,Bone-Thugs-N-Harmony,2-Pac,Nipsey Hu$$le,CeeLo Green,Snoop Dogg,Future,Good Charlotte, & EA Games soundtracks, namely Fight Night Round 4, Madden 09, Madden 10, The Sims 3, NBA Live 09 and NBA Live 10. As well as his roles in movies “Malibus Most Wanted” / Just Another Day/“Love Chronicles”(secrets revealed) the Power of Love/ My Baby's Daddy & TV shows “UNSOLVED” “CELLIES” “NEVER TOO HOOD TO BE HEALTHY”

Music career

André started writing poetry in the third grade and he started rapping in the fifth grade (age ten). In 1997 his first album was released. Young Dre is also one of the three members of the rap group OBG Rider Clicc, along with Young Maylay and Killa Polk. He described his stage name as coming "from my peers, who were in the streets with me and knew me well. They started saying "you speak the truth" all the time."

Film career
André Truth pka Young Dre had roles in the movies Malibu's Most Wanted, Just Another Day and My Baby's Daddy as well as Directing new Amazon Prime series “CELLIES”starring Slink Johnson{Black Jesus}[adult swim]Hulu André’s passion is writting/directing & producing films, as well as having collaborated for the respective soundtracks. As André places music on several tv series for Starz/Disney/ for Sony Music Publishing. He started directing his own music videos and then went on to be a story consultant, associate producer and one of the stars  of the movie Just Another Day which he produced & wrote (rewrite) as his first major motion picture collaboration.

Discography

Filmography

References

External links
 

Living people
African-American male rappers
Crips
Rappers from Los Angeles
Rappers from Washington (state)
Songwriters from California
African-American songwriters
West Coast hip hop musicians
Date of birth missing (living people)
Gangsta rappers
21st-century American rappers
21st-century American male musicians
Year of birth missing (living people)
21st-century African-American musicians
American male songwriters